Alison Gold (born May 9, 2002) is an American former pop singer. She is best known for the single "Chinese Food".

Career
Alison Gold was born in Fairfax, Virginia. In 2012, she began working with Patrice Wilson, with whom she has worked on all her songs to date. Her first single, "Skip Rope", was released as part of the musical duo Tweenchronic made up of Alison and another girl identified as "Stacey". Her first single as a solo artist, "Chinese Food", was written by Wilson; Gold stated that she "loved it right away" after Wilson demoed it for her, and recorded it soon after. Wilson raps on the chorus in an accent. The song became a viral hit, charting at number 29 on the Billboard Hot 100 in November 2013 and reaching 14 million YouTube views by March 2014. The video for "Chinese Food" included images of Wilson dancing in a panda costume and dancers flanking Gold in (Japanese) geisha outfits. 

Despite its chart and viral success, both the song and music video received an overwhelmingly negative response by critics, with some of those critics regarding it as one of the worst songs ever. It was mainly criticized as having simplistic portrayals of other cultures, with Billboard calling it "outright racist" and ranking it 2nd in their 2015 list of "The 10 Worst Songs of the 2010s (So Far)". The Chicago Reader thought it remarkable that the song's "having bugged millions of people in an interestingly annoying way has earned [it] a spot, however small, in pop's history books." Both Gold and Wilson have rejected the song's accusations of racism, with Gold stating: "I don't really understand what that's all about... I mean, I'm not trying to criticize anyone – I just really love Chinese food!" Patrice Wilson eventually removed the video from his channel in 2018, although it was later re-uploaded by others on YouTube.

She later went on to do another single with Wilson titled "ABCDEFG", which did not chart (this was also removed in 2018 by Wilson). The music video for her third and final single done with Wilson, "Shush Up", received extensive backlash and further controversy relating to Gold's overtly sexualized appearance and its depiction of her as a criminal, at one point being executed in an electric chair. The official copy of the video was later removed from YouTube, and Gold has not released any new music since.

Discography

Other releases
2013: "Skip Rope" (credited to Tweenchronic)

References

External links
YouTube channel

Living people
2002 births
American Internet celebrities
21st-century American singers
Child pop musicians
Singers from Virginia
American child singers
American women pop singers
People from Fairfax, Virginia
21st-century American women singers